The Agricultural and Marketing Research and Development Trust (AGMARDT) was established in October 1987 by the government of New Zealand.  Its purpose is the "promotion and encouragement of New Zealand's interest in the agricultural, pastoral, horticultural and forestry industries".

Funds for the establishment of the trust came from the winding up of the British, Christmas Island and New Zealand Phosphate Commissions.

The trust's 2017 report shows grants made in the 2016/17 year totalled $NZ3.975 million.

Current operations

The trust provides grants to help develop New Zealand's agricultural, horticultural, pastoral and forestry industries, including funding farming research projects, industry support, doctoral scholarships, post-doctoral fellowships and conference funding. Its strategic priorities are:

Enabling agribusiness to integrate with customers in the marketplace
Encourage and support innovative solutions in agribusiness value chains
Supporting future leaders and governance programmes for agribusiness

The current trustees are:
Tony Egan (Chairman)
Brook Brook
Sarah von Dadelszen
Richard Green

References

External links
AGMARDT

Agricultural organisations based in New Zealand
1987 establishments in New Zealand
Organizations established in 1987